Vladimir Arzumanyan (born 26 May 1998 in Stepanakert, Republic of Artsakh) is an Armenian singer. He represented Armenia in the Junior Eurovision Song Contest 2010 with the entry Mama (Մամա). In the final Vladimir won, becoming the first Armenian singer to have won in a Eurovision event. The song was produced by Canadian-Armenian music producer DerHova. Ten years later in 2020, he competed in the 2020 edition of Depi Evratesil, the Armenian national final for the Eurovision Song Contest.

References

Junior Eurovision Song Contest entrants for Armenia
Junior Eurovision Song Contest winners
Living people
21st-century Armenian male singers
Armenian child singers
People from Stepanakert
1998 births
Armenian pop singers
21st-century Ukrainian male singers